Brighton is the name of some places in the U.S. state of Wisconsin:

Brighton, Kenosha County, Wisconsin, a town
Brighton (community), Kenosha County, Wisconsin, an unincorporated community
Brighton, Marathon County, Wisconsin, a town